Rima al-Qadiri (born 1963) is a Syrian Arab politician who served as Minister of Social Affairs and Labour from 2015 to 2020.

Early life
Rima al-Qadiri was born in 1963 in Damascus, Syria. In 1986 she graduated from the Damascus University from the French Literature Department of the University. She worked in private institutions after graduating. She also worked in the Syrian Commercial bank.

Career
Rima al-Qadiri joined the International Planning and Cooperation Commission as the assistant head in 2009. In 2014 she was promoted to the head of the commission. She was sworn in as the Minister of Social Affairs on 22 August 2015 by President Bashar al-Assad. She replaced the previous Minister Kinda al-Shammat. She met Syrian expatriates from Sao Paulo, Brazil and discussed ways they could support the Syrian government. In April 2017 she attended the summit of women affairs ministers from Muslim majority countries that was held in Mashhad, Khorasan Razavi, Iran. She met Shahindokht Molaverdi, the Vice-President for Women and Family Affairs of Iran, on the sidelines of the summit in Iran. She visited Belarus on 29 August، 2017 and met the President of Balarus Alexander Lukashenko. They discussed ways of providing education to Syrian children in Belarus.

References

Living people
1963 births
People from Damascus
Damascus University alumni
Arab Socialist Ba'ath Party – Syria Region politicians
21st-century Syrian women politicians
21st-century Syrian politicians
Women government ministers of Syria
Government ministers of Syria